The 1999/00 FIS Ski Flying World Cup was the 10th official World Cup season in ski flying awarded with small crystal globe as the subdiscipline of FIS Ski Jumping World Cup. First ski flying team event in history was held this season in Planica.

Calendar

Men

Team

Standings

Ski Flying

Nations Cup unofficial

References 

World cup
FIS Ski Flying World Cup